Lang Bobi Suzi is a legend from the Kriol folklore of Belize. According to the legend, Lang Bobi Suzi is a female monster who whips naughty children with her giant breasts if they refuse to do her bidding.

References

Belizean folklore
Mesoamerican legendary creatures
Female legendary creatures